Earl "The Ghost" Washington (April 3, 1921 in Chicago, Illinois – June 18, 1975 in Evergreen Park, Illinois) was a jazz pianist.

Early life
Earl Edward Washington was born, the third child (two older sisters before him), on Sunday, April 3, 1921, in the Prairie Avenue District neighborhood on the near Southeast Side of Chicago. His parents experienced hard economic times in the pre- and post-Depression era, moving their ever-expanding family to the small neighborhood of Morgan Park where they could afford a home. Washington attended Washburn High School, also on the South side of Chicago, that his mother enrolled him in due to his interest in "art".

As a young boy, Washington wanted to be a jazz pianist, but his mother wanted him to study classical music, as she had done as a child herself. She arranged private classical piano lessons with the family's music teacher Dr. Walter Dellers (Professor of Music at the Chicago Academy of Music). Dellers advised her not to change his eye–hand coordination that was so envied by most ragtime musicians of the era.

In the summer of 1938, Washington competed in the Chicago Golden Gloves boxing tournament. It is unknown if he won the event at his 160-pound weight class.

After dropping out of high school in his junior year, he worked as a laborer at Inland Steel located in nearby East Chicago, Indiana.

During World War II, Washington enlisted in the United States Navy as an Apprentice Seaman II; emphasis as a musician (MU SEA). He joined the Illinois Great Lakes Navy Orchestra from 1943 to 1945.

After time spent in the Navy, he attended both the Boston and Chicago Conservatories of Music. He joined the Chicago Musicians' Union Local 10–208 on November 15, 1945.

Career
Washington joined the Red Saunders Band in 1949 at the popular nightclub Club DeLisa, where he remained until the mid 1950s. On leaving Saunders' band, Washington worked in the recording studios of Chicago, Detroit and New York City. He wrote music for Motown artists and recorded scores and jingles with Chicago's jazz pioneer/innovator Quincy Jones and nationally known Chicago disc jockey Herb Kent on Chicago's WVON Radio.

While representing the Motown jazz imprint and releasing a couple LPs on its sub-label Workshop Jazz Records, Washington worked as a featured artist at Chicago's Blue Note Club, the Gaslight Club and the Playboy Club.

Before his death, Washington worked at The Inn Place, taught private jazz-piano lessons and lectured on "The History of Jazz" at Indiana University.

Washington's nickname, "The Ghost", grew out of his light-skin complexion.

-	Johnny Pate wrote the liner note for Washington's Workshop released LP "Reflections."

"There is much that can be said about a serious musician, and Earl Washington is a very serious musician. He is the kind of musician who spends practically all of his time working on his music in one way or another. When he is not practicing at the piano, he’s writing either original works, or arrangements. In his spare time he listens to some of his favorites, which include Art Tatum, Oscar Peterson, Quincy Jones, plus contemporary composers such as Ravel, Stravinsky, and Bernstein.

“Earl evidently does not believe in the biblical admonition, ‘Let not thy left hand know what thy right hand doesth,’ at least not when he's playing piano. For on ‘It Ain’t Necessary So’ he uses both hands beautifully and each definitely knows what the other is doing. It is the left hand playing that pleasant intro leading into the gently rollicking syncopation that is the mood of the ‘preaching’ right hand throughout the recording.

"At present Earl is engage in composing a suite entitled, “Omen Portend.” This work will feature the piano with orchestral background. He is in hopes of recording it in the very near future.

“Reflections,” the title tune, is a blues with a far-eastern tint. Earl seems to be remembering, or reflecting over, if you please, a trip through valleys, hills and streams in some far away land of a strange name. He seems filled with awe – and beautifully projects that feeling to the listener. Vernel Fournier (Drummer) seems delighted with the trip, eager to move around that next rhythmical corner. Israel Crosby (Bassist) seems to have been there before; he moves ably, steadily, surely throughout. “Reflections” is a musical journey the listener will want to make again many times.

"Mr. Washington’s treatment of “After Hours” is quite unique, due to the fact that he first does a rendition quite close to the original Avery Parrish version. Then he expresses his personal feeling for this."

- Mr. Pate worked as a Pianist, Bassist; an Arranger of Production Numbers for the Club Delisa (in the 1950s); a Composer, Conductor, and Producer is an important figure in the evolution of music on the Chicago music scene. His name appears in the credits of classic hits by Curtis Mayfield and The Impressions. He also acts on Okeh Records and Workshop Jazz label; wrote and scored “Shaft In Africa,” which became a theme backdrop for Jay Z’ 2006 platinum award winning CD Show Me What You Got.

Personal life
Washington was married to Dorothy Jean for 20 years. They raised six sons in their Chicago south side community home in Washington Heights.

Washington died of a heart attack on June 18, 1975 in Evergreen Park.

Discography

The majority of Washington's recordings were with big bands.

From 1947 to 1954 Washington was part of Red Saunders Band at the Club Delisa.

Washington also made several recordings with his band “Earl Washington, All Star Jazz” (1954-1964).

References

External links

Billboard - Motown Launches New Jazz Series
Billboard - Miserlou Checker 905
Billboard - Cutting tapes at Universal Studios
Billboard - Motown in Brussels
Motown Junkies, "Because It's What's In The Grooves That Count." Earl Washington All Stars: “Opus No. 3″

1921 births
1975 deaths
Musicians from Chicago
American jazz pianists
American male pianists
United States Navy sailors
United States Navy personnel of World War II
20th-century American pianists
Jazz musicians from Illinois
20th-century American male musicians
American male jazz musicians